is a tea house originally constructed in 1779 by Lord Matsudaira Harusato, daimyō of the Matsue clan at that time. It is located in Matsue, Shimane, Japan. 

Meimei-an was designed in the style of the Fumai-ko school of tea ceremony (茶道), which was created by the seventh Lord of the Matsudaira to rule from Matsue. His name was Harusato, however, his nickname was Fumai-ko, thus his style of tea ceremony also took on the name Fumai-ryu (不昧流).

References

External links 

Buildings and structures in Shimane Prefecture
Chashitsu
Tourist attractions in Shimane Prefecture